Nicholas Freudenberg is public health practitioner who currently serves as a Distinguished Professor at the City University of New York School of Public Health.

References

Year of birth missing (living people)
Living people
City University of New York faculty
American sociologists